Juan Francisco Cáceres de la Fuente (born 26 October 1962) is a Mexican politician affiliated with the PAN. As of 2013 he served as Deputy of the LXII Legislature of the Mexican Congress representing Tabasco.

References

1962 births
Living people
Politicians from Tabasco
National Action Party (Mexico) politicians
21st-century Mexican politicians
Deputies of the LXII Legislature of Mexico
Members of the Chamber of Deputies (Mexico) for Tabasco